Shelby County Public Schools is a school district based in Shelbyville, Kentucky, which serves Shelby County. As of 2020, all schools are closed due to the COVID-19 pandemic, but are expected to reopen the following school year.

Schools
The district operates the following schools:

Elementary Schools
Clear Creek Elementary School
Heritage Elementary School
Painted Stone Elementary School
Simpsonville Elementary School
Southside Elementary School
Wright Elementary School
Middle Schools
Shelby County East Middle School
Shelby County West Middle School
High Schools
Martha Layne Collins High School 
Shelby County High School
Other
Marnel C Moorman K-8 School
Education Center @ Cropper
Area Technology Center

External links
Official site

Education in Shelby County, Kentucky
School districts in Kentucky